Gavot may refer to:
 Gavòt, a subdialect of Vivaro-Alpine Occitan.
 Gavotte, a dance that exists in both folk forms and historical court forms.